Beaver River is a large river in east-central Alberta and central Saskatchewan, Canada. It flows east through Alberta and Saskatchewan and then turns sharply north to flow into Lac Île-à-la-Crosse on the Churchill River which flows into Hudson Bay.

It was first documented on the Turnor map of 1790, and then confirmed on the Harmon map of 1820.

Basin and course 
East of the Athabasca River basin and north of the North Saskatchewan River basin, the Beaver River Basin is part of the Churchill River basin.

The east-flowing part passes in and out of the forest zone several times and is approximately parallel to Alberta Highway 55 and Saskatchewan Highway 55. Its source, Beaver Lake is just south of Lac la Biche which drains into the Athabasca. It exits Beaver Lake on the west side and flows south until it receives from the west the Amisk River. The outflow of Moose Lake comes in from the south. It enters Saskatchewan just south of Cold Lake and from Cold Lake the Waterhen River runs just north of and parallel to it. In Saskatchewan it receives from the south-west the outflow of Minnistikwan Lake and then the outflow of Meadow Lake to the south. At the great bend it receives from the south a river from Green Lake.

The north-flowing part flows through thinly populated boreal forest. Saskatchewan Highway 155 follows its west bank. It receives from the east Cowan River, which drains Cowan Lake and Deleronde Lake, and from the west the Waterhen River, from the east Doré River draining Doré Lake. The highway leaves the river at Beauval Forks and near Beauval, Saskatchewan it receives the outflow of Lac la Plonge from the east. It continues northward east of the south arm of the lake and enters Lac Île-à-la-Crosse across the lake from the village of Île-à-la-Crosse.

Tributaries 
Tributaries of Beaver River from upper to lower watershed

Amisk River
Mooselake River
Sand River
Wolf River
Manatokan Creek
Jackfish Creek
Marie Creek
Reita Creek
Redspring Creek
Vermilion Creek
Makwa River
Horsehead Creek
Rabbit Creek
Meadow River
Green River
Tea Creek
Cowan River
Big River
Beatty Creek
Waterhen River
Rusty Creek
Cold River
Martineau River
Hillyer Creek
Doré River
Olsen Creek
Rivière la Plonge
Pine River

Exploration and fur trade 

The river, or parts of it, is described as poor canoe country. Crews had to drag their canoes over the shallow parts and there was little game. The mouth of the Beaver River is on the main axis of the fur trade. From at least 1795 buffalo pemmican was brought north to feed the voyageurs on their way to the Athabasca Country. One route led south to the great bend of the Beaver, through Green Lake, Saskatchewan, and over an Indian track to Fort Carlton. In 1875–76 this was replaced by a cart road at about the time steamboats appeared on the Saskatchewan. Another route went further up the Beaver to Moose Lake and by some route to Fort George.

The first European to reach the Beaver may have Louis Primeau in 1767. About 1768 William Pink was on the river. He went north-west from the lower Saskatchewan followed the Beaver west and returned to the Saskatchewan near Edmonton. In 1776 Primeau working for Thomas Frobisher built a post on Lac Île-à-la-Crosse. In 1781 Montreal traders built Cold Lake House near Beaver Crossing. In perhaps 1782 the North West Company built a post on Green Lake. In 1798 David Thompson used the Beaver to reach Lac La Biche. In 1799 the Hudson's Bay Company decided to push west up the Churchill from Frog Portage. In that year they built rival posts on Lac Île-à-la-Crosse and Green Lake. They also built a post above the great bend at Meadow Lake, Saskatchewan, that only lasted two years. There was a great deal of conflict between the two companies until the merger in 1821.

Conservation, recreation, and development 
Beaver River flows through a predominantly flat area with rolling and undulating hills, and many lakes are drained through meandering streams into the river; among the larger ones are: Pinehurst Lake, Primrose Lake, and Cold Lake. The Cold Lake Area Weapons Range occupies much of the northern area of the river basin.

Lakeland Provincial Park, Moose Lake Provincial Park, and Cold Lake Provincial Park all lie in the river basin on the Alberta side, while the Meadow Lake Provincial Park protects a large area in Saskatchewan in the Waterhen River watershed.

Saskatchewan provincial recreation sites 
There are three Saskatchewan provincial recreation sites along the river's course. They include Beaver / Cowan Rivers Recreation Site, Beatty Lake Recreation Site, and Beaver River Recreation Site.

Fish species 
The fish species include walleye, sauger, yellow perch, northern pike, lake trout, lake whitefish, cisco, white sucker, longnose sucker and burbot.

See also 
List of rivers of Alberta
List of rivers of Saskatchewan
Hudson Bay drainage basin
North American fur trade

References

External links 

 Fish Species of Saskatchewan
 Meadow Lake Provincial Park

Rivers of Alberta
Rivers of Saskatchewan
Tributaries of Hudson Bay